The Morley–Ellenbrook line is a planned suburban rail service between the Perth central business district and Ellenbrook in Western Australia. Construction began in 2021 as part of Metronet.

History
A passenger railway through Morley, branching from the Midland line at Bayswater, was included in the 1955 Stephenson-Hepburn Report. However, the government did not incorporate it into the Metropolitan Region Scheme derived from the report when it was adopted in 1963.

A rail line to Ellenbrook was first proposed by the Carpenter Government as an election commitment in the lead up to the 2008 election. The then-opposition Liberal Party matched the commitment, and while they continued to express support for some time after winning the election, a feasibility study was cancelled in 2009 and ultimately nothing eventuated. Premier Colin Barnett later declared that there was not yet the demand. 

Instead, in 2011, a bus rapid transit system to Ellenbrook was proposed as part of a transport plan to 2031. Before the 2013 election, the opposition Labor Party instead promised a rail line branching from the existing Midland line at Bayswater as part of their Metronet scheme. While the bus system had already undergone design work in 2012, it was ultimately cancelled days before the 2013 election on the basis that its cost was unjustifiable given that rail was still intended to be the long-term plan.

In 2016, ahead of the 2017 election, the Barnett Government proposed a new, modified version of their BRT system to Ellenbrook. Also in 2016, they proposed in the longer term a rail tunnel from Perth to Morley, with a possible later extension to Ellenbrook. The opposition Labor Party instead renewed their commitment to build an above-ground line to Ellenbrook and Morley via Bayswater as part of their modified Metronet scheme. After winning the election, the incoming McGowan Government cancelled the BRT plans, but were criticised for delays in planning and funding the rail line.

The route alignment for the line was confirmed in August 2019. In April 2020, two consortia were shortlisted by the Public Transport Authority of Western Australia. On 22 September 2020, MELconnx Consortium (led by Laing O’Rourke) was announced as the preferred group to build the infrastructure for the line. On 19 October 2020, a construction contract was signed with MELconnx Consortium with early works to begin immediately.

Route
The new service will share infrastructure with the Midland and Airport lines between Perth and Bayswater. The new railway for the service will travel in the centre of Tonkin Highway, through land north of Marshall Road and along the western side of Drumpellier Drive before ending in Ellenbrook.

With the Morley-Ellenbrook line's completion, Bayswater station will become a central junction linking with the existing Midland and Airport lines.

Stations
The service will have five new stations at Morley, Noranda, Malaga, Whiteman Park and Ellenbrook, with a sixth station planned at Bennett Springs East.

 Morley Station will be built within Tonkin Highway under the Broun Avenue bridge, with high-frequency bus services connecting it with the Morley town centre.
 Noranda Station will connect Benara Road to better serve the surrounding suburbs, located under Benara Road in the Tonkin Highway median.
 Malaga Station will serve the people around Ballajura, Alexander Heights, Landsdale and the Malaga employment district.
 Whiteman Park Station will serve the people around Brabham and Henley Brook areas and those visiting Whiteman Park.
 Ellenbrook Station will be built in the Ellenbrook town centre.

References

External links
 Morley-Ellenbrook Line web page.

Proposed railway lines in Australia
3 ft 6 in gauge railways in Australia
Ellenbrook, Western Australia
Morley, Western Australia
Morley–Ellenbrook line
Railway lines in highway medians